Michaela Evelyn Ann Strachan (born 7 April 1966) is an English television presenter and singer.

Early life
Born in Ewell, Surrey, Strachan grew up in Hinchley Wood and attended Chadsworth Stage School, then Claremont Fan Court School, both in Esher. In her teens, she suffered from anorexia. Later, while at ArtsEd, London, she briefly held jobs as an Avon lady and as a kissogram. After her years at ArtsEd, Strachan performed in theatre, before moving on to children's television.

In 1984, she appeared in the musical Seven Brides for Seven Brothers at the Grand Theatre, Blackpool.

Career

Television
Strachan was a presenter on Saturday-morning television in the 1980s, involved in such programmes as Good Morning Britain and Wide Awake Club with Timmy Mallett. In 1988, she hosted Boogie Box on music channel Music Box. From 1988 to 1992, Strachan starred as "Her" in the nightclub-set music show The Hitman and Her alongside Pete Waterman. In 1993, Strachan joined The Really Wild Show, a wildlife programme for children on BBC1.

She was a regular reporter for BBC One's Countryfile for many years until the programme underwent a primetime Sunday evening revamp in April 2009. Her move to South Africa prevented her from committing fully to the new show. While filming an item for Countryfile in 2002, Strachan entered the World Gurning competition at Egremont Crab Fair. To her surprise she won the Ladies' World Gurning Crown.

Strachan co-presented two series of Orangutan Diary with Steve Leonard for BBC One. These series followed the daily routines at a reserve for orphaned orangutans in Borneo and the work of Lone Drøscher Nielsen and her team in rescuing and rehabilitating the orangutans. They were broadcast in 2006 and 2008. She told The Independent that her greatest inspiration is Lone Drøscher Nielsen who "works under very difficult conditions and shows an all-consuming dedication to these animals".

In November 2013, she presented the six-part series The Great Penguin Rescue on the Eden channel.

In January 2014, she was a contestant in series 2 of celebrity diving TV Show Splash!.

In August 2022, Digging For Treasure: Tonight premiered on Channel 5; Strachan is co-presenting the archaeology series with Dan Walker and archaeologist Raksha Dave.

In 2022, Strachan will present Extreme Conservation which will be shown on BBC World News and BBC Reel.

Springwatch and Autumnwatch

Strachan, with Chris Packham and Martin Hughes-Games, presented BBC Two's Autumnwatch in late 2011. For the first four weeks it was presented from the National Arboretum at Westonbirt. For the final four weeks, it was presented from the Wildfowl & Wetlands Trust's Slimbridge reserve. Michaela Strachan that series replaced Kate Humble. She has also replaced Humble on Springwatch since 2012 after Humble decided to pursue other projects.

Music
Strachan has also had a brief music career as "Michaela" with two UK hit singles; a cover of Edwin Starr's "H.A.P.P.Y. Radio" (UK No. 62, 1989) and "Take Good Care of My Heart" (UK No. 66, 1990).

She is mentioned in the song "Michaela Strachan You Broke My Heart (When I Was 12)" by Scouting for Girls.

Personal life
Strachan married filmmaker Duncan Chard in 1996, but they divorced five years later. On 8 June 2005, she gave birth to her son Oliver by  partner Nick Chevallier. The couple live in Hout Bay, Cape Town with Chevallier's children.

She is a celebrity supporter of the charity World Vision as a child sponsor. She also supports their Alternative Gifts charity; life-changing gifts for communities in the developing world.

She is allergic to elephants.

In October 2014, she revealed that she had had a double mastectomy and reconstructive surgery following a diagnosis of breast cancer.

References

External links

1966 births
Living people
People from Ewell
People educated at the Arts Educational Schools
British children's television presenters
English television presenters
People educated at Claremont Fan Court School
English television actresses
BAFTA winners (people)
English women singers
English women writers
People from Cape Town
British expatriates in South Africa